Cleland may refer to:

Places

 Cleland, South Australia, a suburb
 Cleland National Park, a protected area in South Australia
Cleland Wildlife Park, a zoo within the area of Cleland National Park 
 Cleland, North Lanarkshire, a small village in Scotland
 Cleland railway station, the Network Rail train station in the abovementioned village

People
 Cleland (surname)